Johnston is a town in Providence County, Rhode Island, United States. The population was 29,568 at the 2020 census. Johnston is the site of the Clemence Irons House (1691), a stone-ender museum, and the only landfill in Rhode Island. Incorporated on March 6, 1759, Johnston was named for the colonial attorney general, Augustus Johnston.

Geography

Neighborhoods
Neighborhoods in Johnston:
Winsor Hill,
Thornton (includes part of Cranston),
Graniteville,
Hughesdale,
Morgan Mills,
Manton,
Simmonsville,
Pocasset,
West End,
Belknap, and
Frog City.

History
The area was first settled by English settlers in the seventeenth century as a farming community. In 1759 the town officially separated from Providence and was incorporated on March 6, 1759. Johnston was named for the current colonial attorney general, Augustus Johnston, who was later burned in effigy during the Stamp Act protests in 1765 and then fled Rhode Island as a Tory during the American Revolution in 1779. The first house of worship in Johnston opened when the Baptist Meeting House in Belknap was constructed in 1771. During the American Revolution Rhode Island's only gunpowder mill was constructed in Graniteville, and the town hosted American General John Sullivan for a dinner in 1779 upon his departure from Rhode Island to fight in New York. In 1790 the Belknap School, the first public school in the town, was founded. In 1791 the Providence and Norwich Turnpike (today's Plainfield Pike) was chartered.

Demographics

At the 2000 census, there were 28,195 people, 11,197 households and 7,725 families residing in the town. The racial makeup of the town was 96.66% White especially Italian Americans (46.7%), 0.65% African American, 0.13% Native American, 1.08% Asian, 0.05% Pacific Islander, 0.55% from other races, and 0.88% from two or more races. Hispanic or Latino of any race were 1.89% of the population.

There were 11,197 households, of which 27.8% had children under the age of 18 living with them, 53.9% were married couples living together, 11.4% had a female householder with no husband present, and 31.0% were non-families. 26.6% of all households were made up of individuals, and 13.2% had someone living alone who was 65 years of age or older. The average household size was 2.47 and the average family size was 3.02.

Age distribution was 20.9% under the age of 18, 6.3% from 18 to 24, 30.0% from 25 to 44, 23.9% from 45 to 64, and 18.9% who were 65 years of age or older. The median age was 41 years. For every 100 females, there were 88.2 males. For every 100 females age 18 and over, there were 84.9 males.

The median household income was $43,514, and the median family income was $54,837. Males had a median income of $40,210 versus $29,314 for females. The per capita income for the town was $21,440. About 6.8% of families and 8.3% of the population were below the poverty line, including 9.0% of those under age 18 and 13.6% of those age 65 or over.

In 2000, 46.7% of Johnston residents identified themselves as being of Italian heritage. This was the highest percentage of Italian Americans of any municipality in the country.

Government
The town is governed by a mayor (currently Joe Polisena) and a five-member town council.

Johnston is policed by the Johnston Police Department.

Education
The Johnston Public School System has four elementary schools, one middle school, and one high school. Johnston Senior High School is a 2005 Rhode Island Department of Education Regents' Commended School.

In 2008, the Johnston School Committee decided to close both Graniteville and Calef Elementary schools. Students affected by the closures were transferred to Brown Avenue Elementary School and Winsor Hill Elementary School. This decision was not without controversy, as school officials, parents and teachers complained of inadequate staffing, increased neighborhood traffic and lack of attention for special-needs students.

Media

Johnston has one local weekly newspaper, the Johnston Sun Rise. The paper is complimentary, and can be found in many Johnston businesses.

WJAR NBC News Channel 10 broadcasts in Rhode Island and Massachusetts. The news station is set in Cranston, Rhode Island.

WLNE-TV ABC 6 Rhode Island News Channel broadcasts in Rhode Island and Massachusetts.

WPRI-TV 12 Fox 64 Providence Eyewitness News Channel broadcasts in Rhode Island and Massachusetts.

New England Cable News channel ("NECN") is a cable news station based in Boston which covers all of New England's news.

Economy
Insurance company FM Global is based in Johnston.

In 2018, Providence-based Citizens Bank opened a $285 million corporate campus in the town. The project encompasses 425,000 square feet and employs around 3,000 people.

Announced in March of 2020, Massachusetts-based grocer Market Basket (New England) will open its first Rhode Island store in the town of Johnston. As of July 19, 2020, a grand opening date has not yet been set. The opening will create 350 local jobs.

Notable people

 Noel Acciari, hockey player with the Toronto Maple Leafs organization
 Amanda Clayton, actress, graduate of Johnston Senior High School
 Paul DelVecchio (a.k.a. Pauly D); DJ, reality TV personality (Jersey Shore); graduate of Johnston Senior High School
Mat Franco, magician
 Samuel Ward King, 15th Governor of Rhode Island; enacted laws that led to the Dorr Rebellion; born in Johnston
 Lou Lamoriello, former general manager of the New Jersey Devils and the Toronto Maple Leafs. Now with the New York Islanders of the NHL; born in Johnston
 Mario Mendez, member of the Rhode Island House of Representatives
 Joe Polisena, Rhode Island state senator; mayor of Johnston
 Joey Spina, professional boxer
 Joe Mazzulla, head coach for the Boston Celtics
 Jeffrey Graham, engineer at NASA, graduate of Johnston Senior High School

Sister cities
 Panni, Apulia, Italy

References

External links

 Town of Johnston, Rhode Island Official website
 Johnston Sunrise newspaper Official website

 
Italian-American culture in Rhode Island
Little Italys in the United States
Providence metropolitan area
Towns in Providence County, Rhode Island
Towns in Rhode Island